Fancy is a DVD of live concert footage compiled from the Les Claypool's Fancy Band 2006 tour. Filmed by Jim "Jimbo" Charna, Jeremy "staunchy" Sewell and Crew, it was released by Prawn Song Records on May 29, 2007. The soundtrack combines soundboard and "taper (Jimbos)" recordings for concert-like experience.

Chapter Listing 
 "Up On The Roof"
 "Of Whales and Woe"
 "Rumble of the Diesel"
 "Long in the Tooth"
 "Vernon the Company Man"
 "Holy Mackerel"
 "Phantom Patriot"
 "Cosmic Highway"
 "Filpino Ray"
 "The Big Eyeball in the Sky"
 "D's Diner"
 "One Better"
(encore)
 "Running the Gauntlet"
 "American Life/Iowan Girl"
 "Lust Stings"

Credits

Featuring 
 Les Claypool - bass, vocals
 Skerik - tenor and baritone saxophones
 Mike Dillon - vibraphone, marimba, percussion
 Gabby La La - sitar, ukulele, theremin, vocals
 Paulo Baldi - drums

Taken From Shows 
 06/21/06 - Austin, Texas
 07/07/06 - Ft Lauderdale, Florida
 07/15/06 - NYC, New York
 07/17/06 - Boston, Mass.
 07/18/06 - Providence, Rhode Island
 07/22/06 - Cleveland, Ohio

References 
 DVD credits

External links
 Les Claypool Official Site

Les Claypool video albums
2007 live albums
2007 video albums
Prawn Song Records video albums
Live video albums